The emancipation of the dissonance was a concept or goal put forth by composer Arnold Schoenberg and others, including his pupil Anton Webern. The phrase first appears in Schoenberg's 1926 essay "Opinion or Insight?" . It may be described as a metanarrative to justify atonality. Jim  describes:

Composers such as Charles Ives, Dane Rudhyar, Duke Ellington, and Lou Harrison connected the emancipation of the dissonance with the emancipation of society and humanity. Michael Broyles calls Ives tone-cluster-rich song "Majority" as "an incantation, a mystical statement of belief in the masses or the people" . Duke Ellington, after playing some of his pieces for a journalist, said, "That's the Negro's life ... Hear that chord! Dissonance is our way of life in America. We are something apart, yet an integral part" . Lou Harrison described Carl Ruggles's counterpoint as "a community of singing lines, living a life of its own, . . . careful not to get ahead or behind in its rhythmic cooperation with the others" . Rudhyar gave the subtitle "A New Principle of Musical and Social Organization" to his book Dissonant Harmony, writing, "Dissonant music is thus the music of true and spiritual Democracy; the music of universal brotherhoods; music of Free Souls, not of personalities. It abolishes tonalities, exactly as the real Buddhistic Reformation abolished castes into the Brotherhood of Monks; for Buddhism is nothing but spiritual Democracy" .

Just as the harmonic series was and is used as a justification for consonance, such as by Rameau, among others, the harmonic series is often used as physical or psychoacoustic justification for the gradual emancipation of intervals and chords found further and further up the harmonic series over time, such as is argued by Henry Cowell in defense of his tone clusters. Some argue further that they are not dissonances, but consonances higher up the harmonic series and thus more complex. ; cited in  gives the following diagram, a specific timeline he proposes:

A 1996 book by Thomas J. Harrison, 1910, the Emancipation of Dissonance, uses Schoenberg's "revolution" to trace other movements in the arts around that time.

Sources

Further reading
 
 

Metanarratives
Post-tonal music theory